Enbiya Taha Biçer (born 2001) is a Turkish taekwondo athlete.

Career 
In 2022, Enbiya Taha Biçer won one of the bronze medals in -87 kg at the 2022 European Taekwondo Championships held in Manchester, England.

References 

Living people
2001 births
Turkish male taekwondo practitioners
European Taekwondo Championships medalists
Islamic Solidarity Games medalists in taekwondo
Islamic Solidarity Games competitors for Turkey
21st-century Turkish people